Domaine de la Léonardsau is a château in the commune of Obernai, in the department of Bas-Rhin, Alsace, France. It is a listed historical monument since 1986.

References

Châteaux in Bas-Rhin
Monuments historiques of Bas-Rhin